KF Bashkimi is a football club, which plays in the town of Kumanovo, North Macedonia. They currently compete in the Macedonian Third League (North Division).

History
Bashkimi was established in 2011, after the dissolution of the club with same name, a club which folded before of the 2008–09 Macedonian First League season, due to a high financial debt. Legally, the two clubs' track records and honours are kept separate by the Football Federation of North Macedonia. FK Bashkimi supporters were called Ilirët.

The club's name means "unity" in Albanian.

References

External links
Club info at MacedonianFootball 
Football Federation of Macedonia 

Bashkimi
Association football clubs established in 2011
2011 establishments in the Republic of Macedonia
Bashkimi